The Bottle is a Canadian comedy-drama film, directed by Alain DesRochers and released in 2000. The film stars Réal Bossé and François Papineau as Réal and François, two longtime friends who decide to recover a beer bottle, containing a paper on which they wrote down their hopes and dreams for the future, which they buried 15 years earlier in the back yard of Antoine (Jean Lapointe), a grumpy old man.

The film's cast also includes Hélène Loiselle, Pascale Bussières, Louis Champagne, Sylvie Moreau and Jean-Pierre Ferland.

DesRochers received a Genie Award nomination for Best Director at the 21st Genie Awards. At the 3rd Jutra Awards, Papineau was nominated for Best Actor, Loiselle was nominated for Best Actress, and Moreau was nominated for Best Supporting Actress.

References

External links

2000 films
Canadian comedy-drama films
Films directed by Alain DesRochers
2000 comedy-drama films
2000s French-language films
Lionsgate films
French-language Canadian films
2000s Canadian films